Tebenna alliciens is a moth of the family Choreutidae. It is known from Bolivia.

References

Tebenna
Moths described in 1926